The Auburn Tigers football program of Auburn University has had  players drafted into the National Football League since the league began holding drafts in 1936. This includes 30 players taken in the first round and four overall number one picks: Cam Newton in 2011, Aundray Bruce in 1988, Bo Jackson in 1986, and Tucker Frederickson in 1965.

Key

Selections

Notes
Chris Woods was part of the 1984 NFL supplemental draft of USFL and CFL players.

References

Auburn

Auburn Tigers NFL Draft